Bruce Howard may refer to:
Bruce Howard (politician) (1922–2002), Canadian politician
Bruce Howard (baseball) (born 1943), Major League Baseball pitcher